The Pari Haupapa Cliffs are bold, ice-covered cliffs that extend north–south between Wirdnam Glacier and Mount Tricouni on the east side of the Lower Staircase of Skelton Glacier. Pari Haupapa, a Māori name meaning "ice cliffs", was applied by the New Zealand Geographic Board in 1994.

References

Cliffs of the Ross Dependency